Referendums (or referenda) are held only occasionally by the Government of New Zealand. Referendums may be government-initiated or held in accordance with the Electoral Act 1993 or the Citizens Initiated Referenda Act 1993. Nineteen referendums have been held so far (excluding referendums on alcohol licensing, which were held triennially between 1894 and 1989). Fourteen were government-led, and five were indicative citizen initiatives.

Government referendums
The government of New Zealand may, at any time, call for a referendum on any issue. This requires enabling legislation to determine whether the outcome will be binding on the government or merely indicative. This allows parliamentary scrutiny of the issue and wording of the question. There is no constraint on whether an issue is to be decided by the New Zealand Parliament or by the public, except for where the reserved provisions of the Electoral Act 1993 are engaged. Section 268 of the Electoral Act 1993 protects some of the provisions of the Act from amendment except in accordance with s 268(2) which requires a majority vote in a referendum of a 75% majority of Members of Parliament. The protected provisions include, inter alia, the term of Parliament, the voting age and the voting method. The provision itself is not protected from ordinary amendment or repeal.

This has led to the sporadic use of referendums, partly because there is no constitutional requirement, as there is in other countries like Australia or Switzerland that have codified constitutions.

Recent examples are the New Zealand flag referendums held across 2015 and 2016, conducted by postal vote.

Constitutional referendums
There is no requirement for a referendum to enact constitutional change in New Zealand. Referendums were held in 1992 and 1993 to decide the nature of electoral reform in New Zealand. Many groups advocate approval of constitutional reforms by referendums; the Republican Movement supports a referendum on whether New Zealand should become a republic.

There are frequent calls for the use of referendums to decide other constitutional matters, rather than by regular Acts of Parliament. In 2003 the Fifth Labour Government replaced the Privy Council as New Zealand's highest court of appeal with a new Supreme Court, despite calls from New Zealand First, National and ACT for a referendum to be held on the issue. In 1950 the abolition of the Legislative Council by the First National Government was done by Act of Parliament; with additional members of the Legislative Council (MLC) appointed to ensure approval by the upper house, the suicide squad.

Liquor licensing referendums
In New Zealand, alcohol licensing has historically been decided by referendum. The first of these were compulsory local licensing referendums, held in 1894 and then with each main parliamentary election between 1896 and 1914. Local licensing referendums were eliminated after 1914, apart from 'local restoration polls' to legalise liquor sales in 'dry' districts. In 1910 a referendum on national prohibition of alcohol was introduced, and held in conjunction with every general election from 1911 to 1987 inclusive (except 1931 and 1951). An extra referendum on prohibition was held on 10 April 1919. From 17 December 1919 the additional option of state purchase and control of liquor (i.e. nationalisation) was added to the ballot. The Sale of Liquor Act 1989 abolished the national liquor referendum. Local restoration polls were still held in areas that were still 'dry', but the last three, Mount Eden, Mount Roskill and Tawa, all became 'wet' in 1999. There have been two referendums on pub closing times.

Other referendums
The government may call referendums on any issues on which it wishes. These will usually be on issues on which the government is split. For the 1997 referendum on retirement savings, the decision to hold it was part of the coalition agreement between National and New Zealand First. For the 2020 referendum on Voluntary Euthanasia, it was originally meant to be passed as a bill of parliament but New Zealand First threatened to vote it down if it wasn't considered to be voted by the people during the 2020 election. The 2020 Cannabis referendum was based on the Confidence and Supply agreement between the Labour Party and the Green Party.

Citizens Initiated Referenda

The Citizens Initiated Referenda Act 1993 allows for citizens to propose a referendum. These are non-binding referendums on any issue in which proponents have submitted a petition to Parliament signed by ten percent of all registered electors within 12 months. There were 3,298,009 voters enrolled for the 2017 general election, so at least 329,801 signatures would be required at a rate of approximately 904 signatures per day. In reality, more signatures would be required to account for variances in electoral roll numbers, duplicate signatures and signatures that cannot be matched to a registered elector.

There are procedural requirements governing this process. It costs NZ$500 to file a petition asking for a referendum with the Clerk of the House of Representatives. The Clerk formally determines the wording of the question, which may be quite different from the original. Once the Clerk receives the completed petition, the number of signatures is initially counted, followed by sample groups of signatures being taken and the signatories' names and addresses checked against the electoral roll. The sampling of signatures is used to estimate the number of valid signatures for the whole petition with confidence, and if the lower confidence interval is more than ten percent of the electoral roll, the petition is presented to the House of Representatives.

Within one month of the petition's presentation to the House, a date for the poll must be determined. The poll must be held within 12 months of the petition's presentation, unless 75 percent of MPs vote to delay the poll for one year. There is also a $50,000 spending limit on promoting the petition.

New Zealand, Italy, and Switzerland are among countries whose laws allow for citizen-initiated referendums (CIRs) nationally. Its defenders view it as a form of "direct democracy". However, the Citizens Initiated Referendum 1993 went against the advice of the Royal Commission on the Electoral System 1986. The Commission stated, speaking about referenda more broadly, "In general, initiatives and referendums are blunt and crude devices.... [that] would blur the lines of accountability and responsibility of Governments".

A total of 48 petitions have been launched since 1993 on a wide range of topics. Only five (one in 1995, two in 1999, one in 2009, one in 2013) have come to a vote. The other petitions failed to gain enough signatures to force a referendum. Achieving the target number of signatures is a requirement for forcing a vote on an initiative proposed by citizens.

Firefighters
The first citizens initiated referendum was held on 2 December 1995. The question "Should the number of professional fire-fighters employed full-time in the New Zealand Fire Service be reduced below the number employed on 1 January 1995?" aimed to elicit a "no" response. Turnout was low as the referendum was not held in conjunction with a general election. Just over 12% voted "Yes" and almost 88% voted "No".

1999 election
At the 1999 election two referendums were put before voters. One was on whether the number of Members of Parliament should be reduced from 120 to 99. Electors overwhelmingly voted in favour of the proposal, with 81.47% voting for this proposal. However, there were no moves to amend the Electoral Act 1993 in line with this result until 2006 when a bill was introduced by New Zealand First MP Barbara Stewart to reduce the size of Parliament to 100. The bill passed its first reading, 61 votes to 60 and was referred to Select Committee. The Select Committee returned recommending the bill to not be passed, citing reasons including public misconception on the MMP voting system, population growth, and international comparability. The bill was subsequently voted down 112 to 9 at its second reading.

The other referendum held in 1999 asked "Should there be a reform of our Justice system placing greater emphasis on the needs of victims, providing restitution and compensation for them and imposing minimum sentences and hard labour for all serious violent offences?". This measure passed by 91.78%. There was some debate over the phrasing of the referendum, as the question actually contains five separate questions; voters could agree with some, but not with others.

Parental corporal punishment

Following the submission of a petition on 22 August 2008, the Clerk of the House verified to Parliament that the threshold for a CIR had been reached. Supporters were hoping for the referendum to be held alongside the 8 November general election, but it was decided by Parliament to hold the referendum by postal ballot between 31 July and 21 August 2009.

The question asked was "Should a smack as part of good parental correction be a criminal offence in New Zealand?"

Voter turnout was 56.1 percent. While 87.4 percent of votes answered 'no', the question drew widespread criticism from the public, parliament, and even the Prime Minister John Key for being a loaded question and for the use of the value-judgement 'good'.

Opponents of citizens initiated referendums
The perceived lack of implementation of successful referendums has led to calls for such referendums to be made binding on the government of the day, similar to the direct democracy said to exist in Switzerland. ACT New Zealand, Family First New Zealand, the Sensible Sentencing Trust and Kiwi Party all advocate binding referendums. However, Kiwi Party President Larry Baldock failed to submit enough signatures for a petition that might have led to a non-binding referendum on whether or not binding citizens referenda should be introduced after being granted permission to circulate a petition calling for that innovation, so the status quo remains. Although the Kiwi Party applied for deregistration, the cause has been taken up by the Conservative Party of New Zealand and its leader, Colin Craig.

By contrast, GayNZ.com has run articles strongly critical of the CIR lobby, as well as expressing concerns that CIRs could be abused to strip vulnerable minorities of their legislative protections, as has occurred frequently with referendums against same-sex marriage in the United States and similar proposals that target illegal immigrants in that country. In some New Zealand media outlets, the Minaret controversy in Switzerland has also been cited as one current example of anti-minoritarian abuse of the 'citizens' referendum process.

Even amongst conservatives, the issue has become contentious. The Maxim Institute has announced its opposition to binding citizens referendums, citing the adverse fiscal management consequences that have ensued in the state of California in a recent paper from Richard Ekins, a University of Auckland legal academic. Former New Zealand Prime Minister John Key also opposes binding referendums on fiscal grounds, noting that California's contradictory tax cap and public spending referendums have made state fiscal management chaotic. However, a key problem with that argument is that ballot initiatives only make up 2% of the Californian state budget, once Proposition 98 is removed from the equation (Proposition 98 locks in education spending which probably would have been spent anyway and had always occupied about one-third of the Californian budget).

During 2009, there was additional criticism from prominent New Zealand legal academics, such as Andrew Geddis and Bridget Fenton at Otago University. They argue that CIRs are no substitute for more deliberative processes within the existing framework of representative democracy, such as joining political parties, protest marches, voting within general elections and parliamentary select committee submissions.

Table of petitions and referendums
The following table lists those petition questions lodged with Clerk of the House from 1994 to 2019.

The 1999 referendums were held in conjunction with the 1999 general election, which is likely to have played a role in the high proportion of voters.

Local government
Local government (regional councils, territorial councils and District Health Boards) may hold referendum on issues which they feel their citizens need to be consulted upon. Referendums have been held on water fluoridation, changing the electoral system to Single Transferable Vote and merging authorities together.

In 2018, The lobby group Hobson's Pledge (fronted by former National Party and ACT New Zealand leader Don Brash) organised several petitions calling for local referendums on the matter of introducing Māori wards and constituencies, taking advantage of the poll provision. These polls were granted and held in early 2018. Each poll failed; Māori wards were rejected by voters in Palmerston North (68.8%), Western Bay of Plenty (78.2%), Whakatāne (56.4%), Manawatu (77%), and Kaikōura (55%) on 19 May 2018. The average voter turnout in those polls was about 40%.

On 1 February 2021, Labour Minister of Local Government Mahuta announced that the Government would establish a new law upholding local council decisions to establish Māori wards. This new law would also abolish an existing law allowing local referendums to veto decisions by councils to establish Māori wards. This law would come into effect before the scheduled 2022 local body elections. On 25 February, Mahuta's Local Electoral (Māori Wards and Māori Constituencies) Amendment Act 2021, which eliminates mechanisms for holding referendums on the establishment of Māori wards and constituencies on local bodies, passed its third reading in Parliament with the support of the Labour, Green and Māori parties. The bill was unsuccessfully opposed by the National and ACT parties, with the former mounting a twelve-hour filibuster challenging all of the Bill's ten clauses.

See also
 New Zealand elections
 Electoral system of New Zealand
 New Zealand constitution

References

Further reading
 Atkinson, Neill. Adventures in Democracy: A History of the Vote in New Zealand. Dunedin: Otago University Press, 2003.
 Catt, Helena. "The Other Democratic Experiment: New Zealand’s Experience with Citizens' Initiated Referendum." Political Science 48, no. 1 (1996): 29–47.
 Church, Stephen. "Crime and Punishment: The Referenda to Reform the Criminal Justice System and Reduce the Size of Parliament." In Left Turn: The New Zealand General Election of 1999, edited by Jonathan Boston, Stephen Church, Stephen Levine, Elizabeth McLeay and Nigel S. Roberts. Wellington: Victoria University Press, 2000.
 James, Colin. "Riding into Battle over Socially and Morally Divisive Bills." New Zealand Herald, 29 July 2003.
 Miller, R. ed. New Zealand Government and Politics 4th edition, 2006, OUP
 New Zealand Press Association. "Referendum Call on Māori Seats" The Dominion, 5 May 1999, 2.
 Palmer, Geoffrey, and Matthew Palmer. Bridled Power: New Zealand's Constitution and Government. fourth ed. Melbourne: Oxford University Press, 2004.
 Parkinson, John. "Who Knows Best? The Creation of the Citizen-Initiated Referendum in New Zealand." Government and Opposition 36, no. 3 ( 2001): 403 - 21.
 Prince, John D. "Look Back in Amber: The General Licensing Poll in New Zealand, 1919-87." Political Science 48, no. 1 (1996): 48–72.
 Simpson, Alan (editor), Referendums: Constitutional and Political Perspectives, Wellington: Occasional Publication No.5, Department of Politics, Victoria University of Wellington, 1992.
 The Political Economy of Six O’Clock Closing (in New Zealand) Tim Mulcare. (Rich Text Format)

Overseas references
 David Broder: Democracy Derailed: Initiative Campaigns and the Power of Money: Harvest Books: 2001.
 Richard Ellis: Democratic Delusions: The Initiative Process in America: University of Kansas Press: 2002.
 Peter Schrag: Paradise Lost: California's Experience, America's Future? New York: New Press: 1998.

External links
 Official Government website - 2020 referendums
 Organising New Zealand Referendums Online
 Elections NZ
Campaign for Democracy
 Better Democracy
 Ministry of Justice
 Citizens Initiated Referenda Act 1993
 Referenda (Postal Voting) Act 2000